In mathematics, a square-free element is an element r of a unique factorization domain R that is not divisible by a non-trivial square. This means that every s such that  is a unit of R.

Alternate characterizations
Square-free elements may be also characterized using their prime decomposition. The unique factorization property means that a non-zero non-unit r can be represented as a product of prime elements

Then r is square-free if and only if the primes pi are pairwise non-associated (i.e. that it doesn't have two of the same prime as factors, which would make it divisible by a square number).

Examples
Common examples of square-free elements include square-free integers and square-free polynomials.

See also
Prime number

References
David Darling (2004) The Universal Book of Mathematics: From Abracadabra to Zeno's Paradoxes John Wiley & Sons
Baker, R. C. "The square-free divisor problem." The Quarterly Journal of Mathematics 45.3 (1994): 269-277.
Ring theory